Thermodesulfobacterium commune is a species of sulfate-reducing bacteria. Its type strain is YSRA-1.

References

Further reading

External links
LPSN

Type strain of Thermodesulfobacterium commune at BacDive -  the Bacterial Diversity Metadatabase

Bergey's volume 1
Thermodesulfobacteriota
Bacteria described in 1983